Sebastián Martínez Cruz (born 25 April 2003) is a Mexican professional footballer who plays as a defensive midfielder for Liga MX club América.

Career statistics

Club

Notes

References

External links
 
 
 

Living people
2003 births
Association football midfielders
Liga MX players
Club América footballers
Footballers from Coahuila
Mexican footballers
Sportspeople from Torreón